Thinobatini is a tribe of darkling beetles in the subfamily Pimeliinae of the family Tenebrionidae. There are at least two genera in Thinobatini, found in the Neotropics.

Genera
These genera belong to the tribe Thinobatini
 Cordibates Kulzer, 1956
 Thinobatis Eschscholtz, 1831

References

Further reading

 
 

Tenebrionoidea